When the Starlight Ends is a 2016 American fantasy comedy-drama film written and directed by Adam Sigal and starring Sam Heughan and Arabella Oz.  It is Sigal's directorial debut.

Cast
Sam Heughan as Jacob
Arabella Oz as Cassandra
Sean Patrick Flanery
Armando Gutierrez as Don
Hunter Gomez as Danny
Georgia Cook as Ellie
George Griffith as Jimmy
AlexAnn Hopkins as Eva
David Arquette as Bill

Production
Heughan and Oz were cast in the film in January 2015.

Release
The film premiered at the Other Venice Film Festival in October 2016.

Accolades
At the Other Venice Film Festival, Heughan and Oz won the awards for "Best Feature Film Actor" and "Best Feature Film Actress" respectively whereas film director Sigal won the award for "Most Excellent Feature Film Director".

References

External links
 
 

2010s fantasy comedy-drama films
American fantasy comedy-drama films
2016 fantasy films
2016 comedy-drama films
2016 directorial debut films
2010s English-language films
2010s American films